Sabbo & Kuti (aka Kutiman) are a production duo working together on side projects from their independently successful careers. Working together to mix various styles of music from hip-hop to funk to reggae, Sabbo & Kuti have established explored mixing and mastering in various projects.

The pair recently won the ACUM Award 2010 for their production and arrangement on prominent soul/funk/reggae singer Karolina's album "What Do I Do Now?".  According to the judges from ACUM-Sabbo & Kuti maintain "a profound understanding of Israeli music and its history and an intelligent use of local sounds and colors in order to produce something that is simultaneously both Israeli and international, and above all something daring, exciting and a fine work of art."

Their most recent project "Better Days" is a dynamic reggae compilation the two created while traveling in Jamaica in 2004.  Featuring artists such as Turbulence. Norris Man, and Milton Blake, "Better Days" is set to be independently released in May 2011. 
Sabbo-  Sabbo is a DJ and producer from Tel Aviv, Israel.  His unique style has brought him to the forefront of the DJ and blog world.  Producing a sound that combines heavy dancehall influences with a mix of bass and global grooves, this DJ has a sound unlike any other.

Sabbo is a member of the critically acclaimed DJ/production crew “Soulico” which released their first album “Exotic on the Speaker” on JDub records in 2009. The album features guest appearances from Ghostface Killah, Lyrics Born, Del The Funky Homosapien, MC Zulu, and Rye Rye.  Recently, Sabbo has been working on official remixes for the likes of T.O.K., Burro Banton, Perfect Loosers, and more. Sabbo released several singles on different labels over the last couple of years..

Kuti (aka Kutiman)- A multi-talented artist from Tel Aviv, Kuti is a musician, composer, producer, and a pioneering video editor.  Kuti's groundbreaking project, Thru-You, was launched in March 2009 and received more than 10 million pages views. Time Magazine chose Thru-You as one of the 50 best inventions of 2009. Internationally lauded, this project also received hailing reviews from newspapers, magazines, blogs, and media outlets all over the globe, including the Washington Post, New York Times, New Yorker Magazine, CNN, Spiegel (Germany), Metro (UK), The Fader, and El Pais (Spain). His work has been deemed "the future of music" and "internet's new frontier.”

Projects
Karolina - What Do I Do Now? (2010)
Better Days (2011)

References

External links
 Myspace

Living people
Israeli musicians
Record production duos
Year of birth missing (living people)
Israeli hip hop groups
Israeli musical duos